is a Japanese footballer who last played for Blaublitz Akita.

Club statistics
Updated to 12 December 2022.

References

External links

Profile at Blaublitz Akita

1992 births
Living people
Sendai University alumni
Association football people from Chiba Prefecture
Japanese footballers
J3 League players
Blaublitz Akita players
Association football midfielders